S. Nainar Kulasekaran (1924 – 30 July 2017) was a social activist from Tuticorin, Tamilnadu. He was known for his activities to protect the Thamirabarani River.

Early life 
He was born in 1924 in Nattathi village, Tuticorin district and started his career as an administrative staff-cum-correspondent in a vernacular daily. He was involved in the Bhoodan movement launched by Vinoba Bhave. He served as District Secretary of Indira Congress in the 1970s.

Social activity 
He founded Thamirabarani Pathugappu Peravai (Thamirabarani Protection Federation). In 2005, he led the farmers' protest when the Coca-Cola plant was set up inside the SIPCOT Industrial Complex. He played a vital role in protesting against illegal sand quarrying, de-siltation in the Srivaikundam dam and industrial pollution on the Thamirabarani.

In 2010, he released Tamirabarani Nadhiyum, Vivasaayigalin Urimaiyum, a book about the Thamirabarani river and the rights of the farmer with detailed work of Thamirabarani flow and irrigation.

References

1924 births
2017 deaths
Indian environmentalists
Activists from Tamil Nadu